Hassan Mohamad Kourani (born 22 January 1995) is a Lebanese footballer who plays as an attacking midfielder for  club Nejmeh and the Lebanon national team.

Club career 
Kourani made his debut for Shabab Sahel under coach Jamal Taha in the 2013–14 Lebanese Premier League season. With six games in the league, Kourani was awarded the Lebanese Young Player of the Year award. On 18 August 2017, Tripoli announced the signing of Kourani on a one-year loan. In May 2020, Kourani's contract with Shabab Sahel expired.

On 15 July 2020, Kourani joined Nejmeh on a two-year contract. In May 2022, he renewed his expiring contract a further three years.

International career 
Kourani made his debut for the Lebanon national team on 19 November 2022, as a substitute in a 2–0 friendly defeat to Kuwait in Dubai, United Arab Emirates.

Career statistics

International

Honours 
Shabab Sahel
 Lebanese Elite Cup: 2019
 Lebanese Challenge Cup: 2014, 2015

Nejmeh
 Lebanese FA Cup: 2021–22
 Lebanese Elite Cup: 2021

Individual
 Lebanese Premier League Best Young Player: 2013–14

References

External links

 
 

1995 births
Living people
People from Bint Jbeil District
Lebanese footballers
Association football midfielders
Shabab Al Sahel FC players
AC Tripoli players
Nejmeh SC players
Lebanese Premier League players
Lebanon youth international footballers
Lebanon international footballers